"Near You" is a popular song written and originally recorded by Francis Craig and His Orchestra at Castle Studio in 1947, with lyrics by Kermit Goell, that has gone on to become a pop standard.

Background
The recording by Francis Craig (the song's composer) with orchestra member Bob Lamm on vocals was released by Bullet Records as catalog number 1001. It first reached the Billboard Best Sellers chart on August 30, 1947, and lasted 21 weeks on the chart, peaking at number one. On the "Most Played By Jockeys" chart, the song spent 17 consecutive weeks at number one, setting a record for both the song and the artist with most consecutive weeks in the number-one position on a US pop music chart.Billboard ranked it as the No. 1 song overall for 1947.

In 2009, hip-hop group The Black Eyed Peas surpassed Craig's record for artist with most consecutive weeks in the number-one position with the songs "Boom Boom Pow" and "I Gotta Feeling".  However, their record was accomplished with combined weeks of two #1 songs - one succeeding the other in the top position.

In 2019, "Old Town Road", by Lil Nas X featuring Billy Ray Cyrus, surpassed "Near You" for song with most consecutive weeks in the number-one position with 19 weeks.

George Jones and Tammy Wynette
In 1977, "Near You" became a number-one country hit as a duet for the duo of George Jones and Tammy Wynette, one of the more unlikely compositions the two country legends ever sang together.  Recorded in the winter of 1974, its atypical arrangement showed that country fans still had an appetite for any music performed by the estranged couple, who had been country music's "First Couple" in the early seventies.  In fact, it was their second consecutive #1 single since their divorce in 1975; they had only managed to top the charts once during their six-year marriage with "We're Gonna Hold On" in 1973.

Other versions
Other recordings of the song that charted on the Billboard best seller in 1947 include: 
The Andrews Sisters (Decca Records catalog number 24171) entered the chart on October 3 and peaked at number four.
Elliot Lawrence (Columbia Records catalog number 37838) entered the chart on October 3 and peaked at number nine. This was Lawrence's only charting hit.
Larry Green (RCA Victor Records catalog number 20-2421) entered the chart on October 10 and peaked at number three.
Two Ton Baker (Mercury Records catalog number 5066) entered the chart at the same time as Green, and peaked at number twelve, staying for five weeks.
Alvino Rey (Capitol Records catalog number 452) entered the chart on October 17 and peaked at number nine in its only week on the chart. This was Rey's last charting hit.
Roger Williams recorded the song in 1958, and it charted on the Billboard Hot 100 singles chart, peaking at number ten.
Jerry Lee Lewis recorded an instrumental version of the song in 1959. It has also been recorded by Marlene Dietrich (1958), Nat King Cole (1962), Pat Boone (1965), Grady Martin and Andy Williams (1959).

Popular culture
In addition, "Near You" was used by Milton Berle as the closing song on his Texaco Star Theater, and became his theme song for many years thereafter.

References

External links
 
 

1947 songs
1947 singles
1976 singles
Songs with lyrics by Kermit Goell
Songs written by Francis Craig
George Jones songs
Tammy Wynette songs
Andy Williams songs
Song recordings produced by Billy Sherrill
Number-one singles in the United States
Epic Records singles